The Milwaukee Crime Family, Balistrieri Crime Family, or Milwaukee Mafia is an Italian-American Mafia crime family based in Milwaukee, Wisconsin. The crime family was considered a branch of the Chicago Outfit. The family's most influential boss was Frank "Mr. Big" Balistrieri, who was greatly involved in the Las Vegas skimming casinos. Today, the crime family is nearly extinct, since Balistrieri died in 1993, with the Chicago Outfit gaining control over some of the illegal rackets in the area.

Historical leadership

Boss (official and acting)
 1918–1921 — Vito Guardalabene — died on February 6, 1921, from natural causes.
 1921–1927 — Peter Guardalabene — the son of Vito Guardalabene
 1927 — Joseph Amato — died of natural causes on March 28, 1927.
 1927–1949 — Joseph Vallone — retired from the rackets in 1949 and died of natural causes on March 18, 1952.
 1949–1952 — Sam Ferrara — in 1952 he was voted out by his family and members of the Chicago Outfit forced him to step down.
 1952–1961 — John Alioto — trained his son-in-law Frank Balistrieri.
 1961–1993 — Frank Balistrieri — imprisoned March 1967-June 1971. In the late 1970s, with his two sons Joseph and John worked with Bonanno crime family capo Michael Sabella. He was imprisoned from 1983-1991 for his involvement in Las Vegas skim racket. He died of natural causes on February 7, 1993.
 Acting 1967–1971 — Joseph Balistrieri Sr. — Frank's son and capo, became underboss in 1993.
 Acting 1983–1993 — Peter Balistrieri — Frank Balistrieri's brother and underboss.
 1993–1997 — Peter Balistrieri — he died of natural causes on August 17, 1997
 1997–2014 — Joseph Caminiti — he served as Frank Balistrieri's consigliere; died in January 2014. 
 2014–present — Peter "Pitch" Picciurro

Underboss
1927–1949 — Steven "Steve" DiSalvo — demoted in 1949, retired in the 1980s, deceased in the 1990s.
1952–1961 — Joseph Gumina — moved to Kansas City, deceased in the 1970s.
1961–1993 — Peter Balistrieri — became boss.
1993–2010 — Joseph "Joey Bal" Balistrieri Sr. — Frank's son, deceased in 2010.

Consigliere
1927–1952 — Vito Seidita — stepped down, retired in 1971, deceased in 1978.
1952–1961 — Carmelo "Charles" Zarcone — demoted in 1961, deceased in 1969.
1961–1997 — Joseph "Joe Camel" Caminiti — became boss.
1997–2014 — Peter "Pitch" Picciurro — became boss.
2014–present — John "Johnny Bal" Balistrieri

Current members
After the death of Frank Balistrieri, the Chicago Outfit has taken control of the Milwaukee illegal rackets. The Chicago Outfit had represented the Milwaukee family on the American Mafia Commission

Administration

Boss — Peter "Pitch" Picciurro — the owner of Pitch’s Lounge and Restaurant and blood relative to Frank Balistrieri. The son of Milwaukee mobster John J. Picciurro and cousin to Frank and Peter Balistrieri. 
Consigliere — John "Johnny Bal" Balistrieri — is the son of Frank Balistrieri the former boss of the Milwaukee family. John served as lawyer until 1984, when his license was suspended and he was later disbarred. In August 2014, John Balistrieri's application to get reinstate his law license was rejected by the Wisconsin Supreme Court.

Soldiers

Aaron "Blue Eyes" Getrieri – operates a loan sharking operation in nearby Brookfield, Wisconsin.

Notes

Further reading
Schmitt, Gavin. Milwaukee Mafia. Arcadia, 2012. 
Schmitt, Gavin. The Milwaukee Mafia: Mobsters in the Heartland. Barricade Books, 2015.

External links
 American Gangland: Balistrieri Crime Family
Dieland: The Milwaukee Family
Milwaukee Mafia
 

Italian-American crime families
Italian-American culture in Wisconsin
Crime in Milwaukee
Gangs in Wisconsin